Arthur François Emile van Schendel (18 May 1910, in Ede – 6 February 1979, in Amsterdam) was a Dutch art historian and museum director. From 1959 to 1975 he was General Director of the Rijksmuseum Amsterdam. He also served two terms as President of the International Council of Museums (ICOM) from 1965 to 1971.
His father Arthur van Schendel was a Dutch writer of novels and short stories.

Publications
 Le dessin en Lombardie jusqu’à la fin du XVe siècle [fr], Brussel, 1938 & Amsterdam, Breitner, 1939.
 De restauraties van Rembrandt’s Nachtwacht [nl], in: Old Holland, 1947.
 De schimmen van De Staalmeesters [nl], in: Old Holland, 1956.

References

Bibliography
 Vries, de, A.B., Arthur van Schendel (1910-1979), in: The Burlington Magazine, 1979.
 Thiel, van P.J.J., All the Paintings of the Rijksmuseum in Amsterdam: a completely illustrated catalogue, Department of Paintings of the Rijksmuseum, Maarssen, G. Schwartz, 1976.

External links
 Arthur Van Schendel in Dictionary of Art Historians

1910 births
1979 deaths
People from Ede, Netherlands
Dutch art historians
Directors of museums in Amsterdam
Rijksmuseum Amsterdam